Crambus niitakaensis is a moth in the family Crambidae. It was described by Nobukatsu Marumo in 1936. It is found in Taiwan.

References

Crambini
Moths described in 1936
Moths of Asia